White River is a small holiday and farming town situated just north of Mbombela in Mpumalanga, South Africa. The farms in the region produce tropical fruits, macadamia nuts, vegetables, flowers and timber. As of 2011, White River had a population of 16,639.

History

Early History 
Archaeological evidence from surrounding areas suggests the land that later became White River has been occupied for thousands of years. Remains of settlements from the 6th-century point to Iron Age African agricultural and livestock-keeping societies that lived in the area. The Plaston site, east of White River, shows evidence of communities in the area from circa 620 CE. Numerous Khoe-San rock painting sites nearby are indicative of even longer human settlement. When   white colonial settlers arrived in the 1800s, the area was inhabited by Swazi and Eastern Sotho (MaPulana & Pai) people. What was known as the Emanzimhlope River, a tributary of the Crocodile River flowed through the region. Emanzimhlope translates to  'White Waters' in siSwati. According to Surplus People Project report, White River was known as Nyavaland by the Africans who lived in the area before white settlement.

Colonial Era 
In 1905, after the South African War, Lord Alfred Milner (British administrator of the Transvaal) demarcated land along the Emanzimhlope river for settlement by British settlers, mainly demobilised British Anglo-Boer War soldiers. Milner tasked soldier Tom Lawrence to allocate land to the settlers, alienating the Africans who were already present in the area from the land. Lawrence became the first manager of the new settlement and the longest street in town is still named after him. Initially, the colonial administration provided settlers with farming equipment and a weekly salary until they began to make an income from their tobacco, citrus, maize and other vegetable crops. Farmers were heavily subsidized until 1907 and the building of a 25 kilometer long irrigation canal improved prospects for some. However, the scheme largely failed and many settlers gave up farming when their contracts ended. In 1911, the Union government sold the farms at White River for a significant loss to a syndicate that planted scale citrus farms on the land. After WWI, the settlement scheme expanded as the land was sold at discounted rates to demobilised white soldiers.

Apartheid Era 
Under Apartheid, White River was designated a white area. Many Emaswati, MaPulana, Tsonga and other African people living in White River and as labour tenants on surrounding farms were forcibly resettled to African reserves and towns like Bushbuckridge, Peinaar and Kabokweni, especially under policies of separate development in the 1960s and 1970s. In 1976, people were removed from White River to Ngodini. The town was the base for the Whiteriver Commando, an infantry regiment of the South African Army.

Region 
White River lies 20 km north of Mbombela, and 46 km south of Hazyview, not far from the border with Kruger National Park. It is 15 km west of the  Kruger Mpumalanga International Airport. The town includes a residential, commercial, and industrial areas while agricultural holdings are on the outskirts of the town. The town features a library, municipal buildings, car dealerships, filling stations, lodges and hotels, churches, a mosque, a police station, and retail centers. It is a popular holiday destination for those looking to visit the Crocodile River Valley, Panorama and Lowveld Legogote Tourism Routes and the Kruger National Park. The town itself has a reputation for its arts and crafts. The Casterbridge Lifestyle Centre situated on the outskirts of the city is a popular tourist stop. Once a mango plantation, the centre now has a cinema, a vintage motor museum and restaurants and hosts art exhibitions, plays and concerts.

Government
White River is in the Mbombela A Municipal Zone, falling under Ward 30 and is currently governed by the Democratic Alliance (DA), South Africa's official opposition party. Rowan Torr was placed as councillor after a by election on the 7 August 2019, where he succeeded Trudie Grove Morgan.

In 2020, the community action group, The Power of 8000, was established to address and redress the condition of the town. Community led and supported projects have included clearing and rehabilitating parks and public spaces, working on litter and sanitation issues, and engaging with the municipality for improved service delivery.

Agriculture 

The White River area is one of the most fertile in the province and farming continues to be a central part of the local economy. After a 26 km canal to channel water from the river was built, new farmers planted fruit trees and established new cultivation methods. Today, agriculture involves largely the production of tropical fruits, macadamia nuts, vegetables, flowers and timber. The farms tend to be relatively small and the agriculture is intensive. Many farmers produce for the export market. Farms are irrigated by nearby dams such as Longmere, Witklip and Klipkoppie.

Education 

 Acek Academy
Flamboyant School
Hoërskool Rob Ferreira High School 
Laerskool White River Primary School 
 Metropolitan College
 Uplands Preparatory and College 
 The King’s School

Climate 
Savannah and woodland scattered with granite outcrops form the indigenous habitat. Compared to other parts of South Africa, the climate is mild with good rainfall. Nevertheless, like the rest of South Africa, White River and its surrounding farms are being adversely impacted by climate change. The area is especially prone to frost, veld fires and droughts that pose food production threats and economic risks to farmers.

Housing and Land 
In 2003, 6 000 hectares of land on the outskirts of White River and surrounding areas were redistributed to the Matsafeni trust when the state purchased the land from Hall & Sons for R63 million under the South African national land reform program. As of 2016, Mbombela, the municipality that White River falls under, had a housing backlog of 34 000 units, impacting low income families especially hard. The persistence of Apartheid-era spatial planning means that land close to the town is expensive and privately owned. This, combined with the economic opportunities and employment, mainly in White River and Mbombela mean that informal settlements around Rocky Drift (Msholozi and Phumlani) and other nearby areas have been established in recent years.

Districts 

 Parkville
 Kingsview
 Colts Hill
 Yaverland

Media 
The town's local newspaper, the White River Post was established in 2006 has a distribution of 5000 copies every two weeks. Larger local papers, such as the Lowvelder and Mpumalanga News also cover news in White River.

External links 
 We Are White River
 White River Artefacts Architecture Profile

References 

Populated places in the Mbombela Local Municipality